GYE or Gye may refer to:

People 
 Gye of Baekje (died 354), king of Baekje 344–346
 Gye of Samhan, king of Mahan confederacy 33 BC–17 BC
 Frederick Gye (1810–1878), English opera manager
 Harold Frederick Neville Gye (1888–1967), Australian cartoonist
 William Ewart Gye (1889–1952), British paleontologist (né Bullock)
 Elsa Gye (1881–1943), music student and suffragette

Other uses 
 Gye, Meurthe-et-Moselle, a commune in France
 Greater Yellowstone Ecosystem
 Guinness Yeast Extract, an Irish savoury spread
 Gynecological Endocrinology, a medical journal
 Gyem language, native to Nigeria
 José Joaquín de Olmedo International Airport, in Guayaquil, Ecuador